Aliagha Vahid Monument is monument in Baku, capital of Azerbaijan, in honor of the Azerbaijani poet and ghazal singer Aliagha Vahid (1895–1965). It was built in 1990.

History 
A monument to Azerbaijan's poet and ghazal singer Aliagha Vahid was first proposed in 1989. It was designed and sculpted solely by Rahib Hasanov.The architect was  Sanan Salamzade. The creative process that had lasted several months was completed in March 1990. The constant, intense endeavors and efforts undertaken by the three artists were artistically and architecturally addressed in the monument. The originality of the monument's form and shape is based on the famous hemistich of the poet nicknamed “Ghazalkhan (Khan of the ghazals) "I am the successor of great Fuzuli". The authors saw the tree trunks rising out of the ground as an artistic sign of the continuation by Vahid of the best tradition of Fuzuli. And the solution of the monument as a large tree-portrait was realized to give the hemistich a comprehensive artistic appearance. Sculptor Rahib Hasanov said the following about the monument:

The process of bronze founding was conducted in St. Petersburg, USSR. The statute's height was previously measured as 5 meters, but it was later decided to reduce its size due to financial problems, now standing at 3 meters tall. Although the monument is made in the form of the poet's head, in fact, it is a multiplot sculpture sample. The statue was officially inaugurated on 27 October 1990 in the garden nor far from the Muslim Magomayev Azerbaijan State Academic Philharmonic Hall. In 2008 the statute was moved from the spot it had occupied since 1990. Its new location is Icherisheher.

Gallery

See also 
 Khojaly Massacre Memorial
 Mustafa Kemal Atatürk Monument, Baku
 Wolfgang Amadeus Mozart monument, Baku

References

Monuments and memorials in Baku